is a town located in Kanagawa Prefecture, Japan. , the town had an estimated population of 31,262 and a population density of 1820 persons per km².

Geography
Ōiso is located on the coastline of central Kanagawa Prefecture, facing Sagami Bay of the Pacific Ocean. The area is generally hilly, rising to Mount Koma (168 metres) in the northwest of the centre of town. The coastline of Ōiso is sandy and is regarded as the western end of the Shōnan area. Ōiso remains a popular beach resort and holiday spot for residents of Tokyo.

Surrounding municipalities
Kanagawa Prefecture
Hiratsuka
Ninomiya

Climate
Ōiso has a Humid subtropical climate (Köppen Cfa) characterized by warm summers and cool winters with light to no snowfall.  The average annual temperature in Ōiso is 15.8 °C. The average annual rainfall is 2144 mm with September as the wettest month. The temperatures are highest on average in August, at around 25.7 °C, and lowest in January, at around 5.2 °C.

Demographics
Per Japanese census data, the population of Ōiso has grown steadily over the past century, with a slight drop from 2010 to 2020.

History
Ōiso is the ancient centre of Sagami Province. The exact location of the Nara period provincial government of Sagami Province is unknown, but tradition and the place name "Kōzu" place its probable location within the boundaries of present-day Ōiso.

As a minor coastal settlement, Ōiso was under the control of the later Hōjō clan of Odawara during the Sengoku period. In the Edo period, it was nominally part of Odawara Domain, and developed as Ōiso-juku, a post town on the Tōkaidō connecting Edo with Kyoto. Blessed with a temperate climate, and with convenient access to Tokyo due to the Tōkaidō Main Line railway, it was favoured as a seaside health resort by politicians and literary figures during the Meiji period after a glowing report on its location was written by noted physician Matsumoto Jun. Prime Minister Itō Hirobumi, Yamagata Aritomo, Saionji Kinmochi and Ōkuma Shigenobu, Foreign Minister Mutsu Munemitsu, writer Shimazaki Toson and zaibatsu founder Yasuda Zenjirō had summer residences in Ōiso. This popularity continued into the postwar era, and Prime Minister Shigeru Yoshida also had a residence in Ōiso to which he retired after leaving politics. The former Itō, Yoshida and Shimazaki residences have been preserved as memorial museums.

Ōiso merged with neighbouring town Kōzu on 1 December 1954.

Government
Ōiso has a mayor-council form of government with a directly elected mayor and a unicameral town council of 14 members. Ōiso, together with neighboring Ninomiya, contributes one member to the Kanagawa Prefectural Assembly. In terms of national politics, the town is part of Kanagawa 15th district of the lower house of the Diet of Japan.

Economy
The local economy of Ōiso is based primarily on seasonal tourism, agriculture and commercial fishing. The town is also a bedroom community for both Tokyo/Yokohama and Odawara

Education
Ōiso has one public elementary schools and one public middle schools operated by the town government. The town has one public high school operated by the Kanagawa Prefectural Board of Education. There is also one private elementary school, middle school and high school. The private Seisa University has a campus at Ōiso.

Transportation

Railway
 JR East - Tōkaidō Main Line

Highway
 
 (from Tokyo to Osaka, Osaka)
 
Seishō Bypass

Sister city relations
 - Komoro, Nagano, since September, 1968
 - Yamaguchi, Nagano, since April, 1973
  - Racine, Wisconsin, United States
  - Dayton, Ohio, United States

Local Attractions
There are several tourist attractions.
Shigitatsu-an
Sagichō Fire Festival

Wildlife
Terugasaki in Ōiso is known as location where the White-bellied green pigeons come to drink saltwater.

Notable people from Ōiso 
Tatsuo Satō, director
 Soeda Azenbō, street musician of the 19th century
Eijiro Ozaki, actor
Miki Sawada, benefactor and social worker

References

External links

Official Website 

Towns in Kanagawa Prefecture
Populated coastal places in Japan
Ōiso